Milena Doleželová-Velingerová (February 8, 1932 – October 20, 2012) was a renowned Czech sinologist at the University of Toronto.

Milena Doleželová-Velingerová received her M.A. degree from the Charles University in Prague in 1955 and her Ph.D. degree from the Czechoslovak Academy of Sciences in 1964.

Bibliography

External links
"Milena Doleželová-Velingerová February 8, 1932 - October 20, 2012 Professor Emeritus, University of Toronto." The Globe and Mail. Saturday October 27, 2012. - Obituary

1932 births
2012 deaths
Czech sinologists
Charles University alumni